Wendelin Förster (often written as Foerster; 10 February 1844 – 18 May 1915) was an Austrian philologist and Romance scholar.

Biography
Förster was born in Wildschütz in Silesia (present day Vlčice, Czech Republic) and educated in Vienna, where he obtained his doctorate in 1872, as a student of Johannes Vahlen. Following a study trip to Paris, he received his habilitation in Vienna with a dissertation involving Romance philology. In 1874, he became an associate professor at the University of Prague, and two years later was named a full professor at the University of Bonn as successor to Friedrich Christian Diez. One of his noteworthy achievements was the definite establishment of the Breton transmission of the Arthurian legend.

Works
His numerous publications of the Old French works include:
 Aiol et Mirabel und Elie de Saint-Gille (1876–1882); two Early French epic poems with notes and glossary and an appendix.
 Li Chevaliers as deus espees (1877); an Old French romance.
 Altfranzösische Bibliothek, volumes i-xi (1879–87) – Old French library.
 Romanische Bibliothek, volumes i-xx (1888–1913) – Romance library.
 Die sämmtlichen Werke von Christian von Troyes, volumes i-iv (1884–99) – Collected works of Chrétien de Troyes.
 Wörterbuch zu Christian von Troyes (1914) – Dictionary of Chrétien de Troyes.

References

 OCLC WorldCat published works

External links
 
 

Austrian philologists
1844 births
Academic staff of the University of Bonn
Academic staff of Charles University
University of Vienna alumni
People from Jeseník District
1915 deaths